Plaka is a village in the municipality of Megalopoli, Arcadia, Greece. It is 1 km south of Soulos, 3 km northeast of Thoknia, 3 km southwest of Nea Ekklisoula and 4 km northwest of Megalopoli. The Greek National Road 76 (Megalopoli - Andritsaina - Krestena) passes east of the village. The Megalopoli Power Plant is located to the south and a large open-pit lignite mine is to the west.

Population

See also

List of settlements in Arcadia

References

External links
History and information about Plaka
 Plaka on GTP Travel Pages

Megalopolis, Greece
Populated places in Arcadia, Peloponnese